List of cultural heritage landmarks of national significance in Vinnytsia Oblast.

Listings

List of historic and cultural reserves

 Historic and Cultural Reserve "Busha"

References
 Rada.gov.ua: Objects of cultural heritage of national significance in the State Registry of Immobile Landmarks of Ukraine — 2009 Resolution of Cabinet of Ministers of Ukraine.

.
.
.cultural heritage landmarks
History of Vinnytsia Oblast
Tourism in Vinnytsia Oblast
Vinnytsia Oblast